Jesper Björkman (born 29 April 1993) is a Swedish footballer who plays for Akropolis IF as a centre-back.

Career

Gefle IF
Björkman left Gefle IF at the end of 2018.

References

External links

1993 births
Living people
Association football defenders
Helsingborgs IF players
Ängelholms FF players
Gefle IF players
AFC Eskilstuna players
Akropolis IF players
Allsvenskan players
Superettan players
Swedish footballers